Following is a list of senators of Oise, people who have represented the department of Oise in the Senate of France.

Third Republic

Senators for Oise under the French Third Republic were:

 Joseph-Hardouin-Gustave d'Andlau (1876–1881)
 Jean-Louis Aubrelicque (1876–1879)
 Franck Chauveau (1888–1906)
 Alphonse Chovet (1888–1905)
 Paul Cuvinot (1879–1920)
 Georges Decroze (1931–1939)
 Victor Delpierre (1920–1933)
 Émile Dupont (1906–1920)
 Célestin Lagache (1879–1888)
 Maurice Langlois-Meurinne (1924–1933)
 Raymond de Malherbe (1876–1879)
 Charles Noël (1906–1930)
 Léon Roland (1920–1924)
 Paul-Édouard Vasseux (1933–1941)
 Alexandre Goré (1933–1940)
 Alphonse Warusfel (1939–1941)

Fourth Republic

Senators for Oise under the French Fourth Republic were:

Jean-Marie Berthelot (1946–1948)
Georges Jauneau (1946–1948)
Robert Sené (1948–1957)
Amédée Bouquerel (1948–1959)
Marcel Dassault (1957–1959)

Fifth Republic 
Senators for Oise under the French Fifth Republic were:

References

Sources

 
Lists of members of the Senate (France) by department